2020 Assam mob lynchings refer to the mob lynching incidents occurred in the Northeast Indian state of Assam in 2020.

Lynching of Jahnobi gogoi
Muslim neighbours threaten to kill  Jahnobi Gogoi in Nazira district for watching Ramayana serial during Ramzan. In a shocking incident, two locals, Samiruddin Ali and Mobidul Rahman attacked a poor Hindu woman in Assam’s Nazira district, for ‘watching TV in her house during the month of Ramzan’. The Muslim neighbours prohibited the woman from watching TV, citing Ramzan. After this, they allegedly gathered in large numbers with sharp weapons and started assaulting the woman. They attempted to murder her by strangulating her.

Lynching of Sanatan Deka 
On 23 May 2020, a vegetable vendor Sanatan Deka was beaten to death by five Muslims at Monahkuchi village, Kamrup district, Assam. Police was able to arrest 2 prime accused.

Lynching of Paragjyoti Neog 
On 23 May 2020, Paragjyoti Neog, a resident of Upper Assam's Chabua, was killed by a muslim mob.

Lynching of Rituparna Pegu 
On 12 June 2020, a man named Rituparna Pegu was lynched was stabbed to death in broad daylight in Guwahati. A muslim family was arrested. The incident caused protests in Guwahati.

References 

Lynching